The sixth and final season of the American television romantic comedy-drama Sex and the City aired in the United States on HBO. The show was created by Darren Star while Star, Michael Patrick King, John P. Melfi, series lead actress Sarah Jessica Parker, Cindy Chupack, and Jenny Bicks served as executive producers. The series was produced by Darren Star Productions, HBO Original Programming, and Warner Bros. Television. Sarah Jessica Parker portrays the lead character Carrie Bradshaw, while Kim Cattrall, Kristin Davis and Cynthia Nixon played her best friends Samantha Jones, Charlotte York, and Miranda Hobbes.

The final season marks dramatic changes in the ladies' lives. While Carrie's book career is on the rise, she dates Jack Berger, a struggling writer, and Alexandr Petrovsky, a renowned Russian artist. Samantha starts a long-term relationship with a struggling actor, who becomes her client, while battling breast cancer. Miranda dates a doctor living in her building before reuniting with Steve, who she later marries. Charlotte converts to Judaism, marries Harry Goldenblatt, and tries to get pregnant through fertility treatments.

While critical reception for season six was mixed to negative, Sex and the City won and was nominated for many awards during the season. All four actresses received Emmy and Golden Globe nominations, with Parker and Nixon both winning Emmy awards. The series also reached viewership highs, with the finale reaching ten million viewers in the United States and nearly five million viewers in the United Kingdom.

Production
The sixth season of Sex and the City was produced by Darren Star Productions and Warner Bros. Television, in association with HBO Original Programming. The series is based on the book of the same name, written by Candice Bushnell, which contains stories from her column with the New York Observer. The show featured production from Antonia Ellis, Jane Raab and series star Sarah Jessica Parker, also an executive producer alongside Michael Patrick King, John Melfi, Cindy Chupack, and Jenny Bicks. Episodic writers return for the fourth season included Bicks, Chupack, Allan Heinberg, King, Julie Rottenberg, and Elisa Zuritsky. New writers enlisted for the season included Nicole Avril, Jessica Bendinger, and Amy B. Harris. The season was directed by returning directors Allen Coulter, King, Charles McDougall, Michael Spiller, and Alan Taylor. Directors new to the series included Martha Coolidge, Michael Engler, and David Frankel. Confirmed as the last season of the series, Sex and the Citys sixth season aired twelve episodes during the summer of 2003 and eight episodes from January to February 2004. The season was filmed from May 2003 to January 2004.

Cast and characters

Like the previous seasons, season six features the same principal cast and characters. Sarah Jessica Parker portrays Carrie Bradshaw, a fashionable middle aged woman who writes about sex and life in New York City in her column, "Sex and the City", with the fictional New York Star. Kim Cattrall played the promiscuous public relations agent Samantha Jones. Kristin Davis portrayed Charlotte York Goldenblatt, an optimistic, straight laced former art curator who remains the most traditional amongst her friends in terms of relationships and public decorum. Cynthia Nixon acted as the acerbic and sarcastic lawyer Miranda Hobbes, who holds a pessimistic view on relationships and men.

The sixth season featured a number of recurring and guest actors whose characters contributed significantly to the series plotlines. Chris Noth reprised his role as Mr. Big, a sly businessman who at this point remains friends with Carrie despite their previous romantic relationships. David Eigenberg portrayed Miranda's on-off boyfriend, bar owner and father of her child Steve Brady. Willie Garson appeared as entertainment manager and Carrie's gay friend Stanford Blatch. Evan Handler plays Charlotte's Jewish boyfriend and subsequent husband Harry Goldenblatt. Lynn Cohen reprises her role as Magda, Miranda's foreign housekeeper. Mario Cantone recurs in the season as Charlotte's gay friend and former wedding planner Anthony Marantino. Jason Lewis joins the series, portraying Smith Jerrod, a burgeoning actor and Samantha's client and boyfriend. Blair Underwood acts as Dr. Robert Leeds, Miranda's neighbor and subsequent boyfriend. Ron Livingston reprises his role as Jack Berger, a writer and Carrie's love interest. Sean Palmer appears as Stanford's boyfriend and client Marcus. Mikhail Baryshnikov appeared in the last episodes as Alexandr Petrovsky, a famed Russian artist with whom Carrie becomes romantically involved.

Reception

Viewership and ratings
Season six of Sex and the City debuted on June 22, 2003 with the episode "To Market, to Market". Garnering a 4.9 Nielsen rating, the episode was seen in over 5.18 million households. "To Market, to Market" attracted 7.30 million viewers, and marked a slight decrease from the fifth-season premiere. Airing on a split summer-winter schedule, the first twelve episodes were broadcast in the summer. The majority of the episodes maintained a viewership above six million viewers, with only two episodes falling below the threshold. The summer season finale, "One", was viewed by 7.65 million people and registered a 5.0 Nielsen rating, eclipsing the 4.9 rating of the season premiere and becoming the highest rated episode of the series. The finale eight episodes were broadcast between January 4 and February 22, 2004. The winter premiere "Let There Be Light" attracted 6.36 million viewers, registering the lowest rated premiere since the season four premiere episode "The Agony and the 'Ex'-tacy". The series finale "An American Girl In Paris" (Part Deux) was viewed by 10.62 million viewers, achieving the highest viewership of the series, as well as achieving the highest household rating with a 6.5. In the United Kingdom, season six episodes consistently ranked among the top ten viewed programs on Channel 4. The series finale achieved a viewership of 4.71 million, the highest the series has received and ranked number two for the week it aired.

Critical reviews
Phil Gallo of Variety wrote a negative review for season six. Gallo noted that the characters have turned "one-dimensional and single-minded" and that the overall quality has declined, deeming the series a "dull rehash of a casual sex maniac searching for prey, an annoying frustrated single mother and a perky divorcee trying to understand Judaism."

Tom Shales of Eugene Register-Guard gave the episode "Let There Be Light" a mixed review, calling it a "slapdashy, mishmoshy affair in which some of the humor feels forced, as well as being inconsistent with the witty-wacky tone of the show." Shales was more positive with the next episode "The Ick Factor", which he stated was "full of snap and fizz and one certifiable shock."

Awards and nominations

As a result of the split season, Sex and the City received Golden Globe award nominations for Best Television Series – Musical or Comedy and Best Actress – Television Series Musical or Comedy for Sarah Jessica Parker in 2004 and 2005. At the 61st Golden Globe Awards, Parker won the award for Best Actress – Television Series Musical or Comedy while Kim Cattrall, Kristin Davis and Cynthia Nixon were all nominated for the award for Best Supporting Actress – Series, Miniseries or Television Film. The series also received nominations for Outstanding Performance by an Ensemble in a Comedy Series in 2004 and 2005 for the season, winning at the 10th Screen Actors Guild Awards. Parker received another nomination for Outstanding Performance by a Female Actor in a Comedy Series at the 11th Screen Actors Guild Awards. At the 3rd PGA Golden Laurel Awards, Michael Patrick King, Cindy Chupack, John P. Melfi, Parker, Jenny Bicks and Jane Raab won the award for Television Producer of the Year Award in Episodic - Comedy for their production work on the series. 

At the 56th Primetime Emmy Awards, Sex and the City received eleven nominations (eight of them for major awards) and won awards for Outstanding Lead Actress in a Comedy Series, awarded to Parker for her portrayal of Carrie Bradshaw, and Outstanding Supporting Actress in a Comedy Series, awarded to Nixon for her portrayal of Miranda Hobbes. The series was also nominated for the award for Outstanding Comedy Series for the sixth time, but lost to the freshman Fox series Arrested Development. Sex and the City was also nominated for Outstanding Casting for a Comedy Series and Outstanding Costumes for a Series, both for the fifth time. Cattrall and Davis were both nominated for an Outstanding Supporting Actress in a Comedy Series Emmy for their respective portrays of Samantha Jones and Charlotte York Goldenblatt, being Cattrall's fifth nomination and Davis's first. The series finale "An American Girl in Paris (Part Deux)" received nominations for four awards, including Outstanding Writing for a Comedy Series and Outstanding Directing for a Comedy Series.

Costume designer Patricia Field won the Costume Designers Guild Award for Best Costume Design – Contemporary TV Series at the 7th Annual Costume Designers Guild Awards. At the 2003 Directors Guild of America Awards, three episodes from season four - "Great Sexpectations" (directed by Michael Patrick King), "Hop, Skip & a Week" (directed by Michael Engler), and "Boy Interrupted" (directed by Tim Van Patten) - were nominated for the award for Outstanding Directing – Comedy Series. Van Patten won the award in 2003 for "Boy Interrupted" and in 2004 for the episode "An American Girl in Paris: Part Deux".

Episodes

Ratings

United States

United Kingdom
All viewing figures and ranks are sourced from BARB.

Home release

References

2003 American television seasons
2004 American television seasons
Split television seasons
Sex and the City